Smoking in Singapore is subjected to restrictions enacted through various legislations such as the Smoking (Prohibition in Certain Places) Act, which was first enacted in 1970.

Prevalence 
In the 2017 national health population survey conducted by the Ministry of Health and Health Promotion Board, it was found that 12% of the population surveyed, aged between 18 and 69, were daily smokers, drop from 18.3% in 1992.

Among the youths and young adults 
Smoking prevalence among students in secondary schools, polytechnics, and Institute of Technical Education dropped from 8% (survey period: 2011-13) to 4% (survey period: 2014-16).  Among Singapore residents aged 18-29 years, 9.9% surveyed in 2017 smoked, a decline from 17.2% in 2007. The average age of smokers who started smoking daily was 18 years old in 2017.

Legislative history 
Smoking was first banned in buses, cinemas and theaters in September 1970, and it was extended to indoor locations where it is frequented by most people on August 1977. After the King's Cross fire in 1987, smoking was banned  in the Singapore MRT.

On 1 July 2005, the ban was extended to bus interchanges and shelters, public toilets and public swimming complexes whereas from 1 July 2006, the ban was extended to coffee shops and hawker centres.

On 1 July 2007, the ban was extended to entertainment nightspots, including pubs, bars, lounges, dance clubs, and night clubs. The owner of the premises is legally responsible for the non-smoking of the customers. The law allows for the construction of designated smoking rooms which can take up to 10% of the total indoor space, or outdoor smoking areas that do not exceed 20% of the outdoor refreshment area.

On 1 January 2009, the ban was extended to all children's playgrounds, exercise areas, markets, underground and multi-story car parks, ferry terminals and jetties. It was also extended to non-air-conditioned areas in offices, factories, shops, shopping complexes and lift lobbies, and within  of entrances and exits.

On 22 November 2010, citizens of Singapore supported the Towards Tobacco-Free Singapore online campaign. The campaign promotes a proposal (which was published in the British medical journal Tobacco Control) to prevent the supply of tobacco to Singaporeans born from the year 2000 which would result in a gradual phasing-out of tobacco in Singapore. The launch was put forward by a team consisting of a lung cancer surgeon, medical officers, a university professor and a civil servant.

On 15 January 2013, the ban was extended to all common areas of the residential block including link ways from bus stops to residential blocks, void decks, corridors, stairwells, stairways and multi-purpose halls, in addition to covered walkways and link ways, all pedestrian overhead bridges, 5 m from the bus stops and hospital outdoor compounds. However, the residential block smoking ban was not mandatory as there are more people smoking except when during wakes or funerals.

On 1 June 2016, the ban was extended to reservoirs, as well as parks managed by JTC, town councils, and NParks. The ban also includes SAF and MHA camps, where smoking is already banned.

From 30 June 2017, food & beverage outlets are no longer allowed new smoking corners.

On 1 October 2017, the ban was extended to autonomous universities' compounds, private hire vehicles, private education institutes, within 5m of all educational institutions, excursion buses and trishaws.

On 1 January 2019, smoking was banned along the Orchard Road shopping district. Smokers can only light up within designated smoking areas in the precinct. Smoking corners in eateries within the precinct were also removed.

Smokers found flouting the rules are fined a minimum 200 Singapore dollars up to a maximum of S$1000 if convicted in court, while the managers of the establishments are fined S$200 for a first offence, and S$500 for a subsequent offence.
Singapore is famous for being clean, with enforced penalties for littering; cigarette butt littering is one of the greatest high-rise littering problems.

Staff working for certain government sectors, such as the National Recycling Program, are not allowed to smoke while carrying out their duties.

Proposed ban in private residences 
In 2018, it was reported by MPs that they received many complaints from their residents about second-hand smoke entering their homes from neighbouring units.

This became a serious issue during the 2020 coronavirus outbreak, which forced many people to spend much longer at home. At the same time, smokers were not allowed to leave their homes just to smoke, as it was not considered an essential purpose. It was reported that the National Environment Agency (NEA) received 11,400 complaints related to smoking in April 2020 or 2,000 cases more than the same period of 2019.

In October 2020, Louis Ng a Member of Parliament called for a ban on residents smoking near windows or at the balconies of HDB flats and private apartments arguing that second hand smoke is a “public health concern”, while at the same time noting that some 383 people in Singapore had died from second hand smoke.

Despite evidence that second-hand smoke can cause stroke, heart disease and lung cancer in adults, as well as various conditions, leading up to and including death, in children, the Singapore government chose to reject the proposed ban.

See also 
 Health in Singapore

References

External links
FAQs on Smoking Ban in Public Places National Environment Agency of Singapore
For Public to Voice out on Smoking Issues Smoke For What (Based in Singapore)
Information on the proposal to prevent supply of tobacco to Singaporeans born from year 2000 Towards Tobacco-Free Singapore

Singaporean criminal law
Health in Singapore
Smoking by country
Drugs in Singapore